Long Hair and Tights is a split live album by Japanese band Boris and U.S. band Doomriders. It was released in 2007 by Daymare Recordings. It was released as a double LP and limited to 1000 copies (500 red vinyl, 500 yellow vinyl). The cover features a homage to the classic Judas Priest album cover Screaming for Vengeance. The first 300 copies of the record came with a "Doomriders vs. Boris" stencil.

Track listing

Side A (Doomriders)
The Long Walk 
Deathbox 
Hell Roaring 
Mercy
Black Thunder

Side B (Boris)
Blackout 
Pink 
Woman on the Screen 
Nothing Special 
Ibitsu

Side C (Doomriders)
Worthless 
Sirens 
The Chase 
Fuck This Shit 
Ride or Die

Side D (Boris)
Just Abandoned My-Self
Farewell

Pressing History

References

Boris (band) live albums
2007 live albums